Walter John Torley Davis (18 October 1915 – 7 October 1971) was an Australian politician.

He was born in Moonee Ponds in Melbourne. In 1953 he was elected to the Tasmanian Legislative Council as the independent member for West Devon. He was elected President of the Council in 1968, serving until his death in 1971.

References

1915 births
1971 deaths
Independent members of the Parliament of Tasmania
Members of the Tasmanian Legislative Council
Presidents of the Tasmanian Legislative Council
20th-century Australian politicians